Notable people with the surname Stap include:

 Don Stap (born 1949), American author
  Jacques Stap, Olympic coach for Dutch sailor Simon Korver
 Jan Woutersz Stap (1599–1663), Dutch Golden Age painter
 Leon Stap (1928 – 1976), American midget professional wrestler known as Fuzzy Cupid
 Sue Stap (born 1954), American professional tennis player